Huang Sheng-shyan or Huang Xingxian (1910 – December 1992) was born in Minhou County of the Fujian province in Mainland China. He began studying Fujian White Crane with Xie Zhong-xian at the age of 14. In 1947 he resettled in Taiwan where he became a disciple of Cheng Man-ch'ing. Yang Ch'eng-fu as the grandson of the Yang style founder, had been Cheng Man-ching’s teacher. Huang committed himself to this tradition for the next 45 years. In 1955 Huang along with eight fellow students of Cheng Man-ching, represented the Shih Chung Association, in the Provincial Chinese Martial Arts Tournament. Huang was adjudged champion in the taijiquan section and runner-up in the open section. Huang emigrated to Singapore in 1956 and then in the 60’s moved to Malaysia, both times with the express purpose of propagating the art of taijiquan.

At the age of 60 Huang Sheng-shyan again demonstrated his abilities in taijiquan by defeating Liao Kuang-cheng, the Asian champion wrestler 26 throws to 0 in a fund raising event in Kuching Malaysia.

By the time of his death in December 1992, he had established 40 schools and taught 10,000 people throughout South East Asia. Huang was considered by some to be the most highly achieved student of Zheng Manqing. In Robert W. Smith’s book, Chinese Boxing: Masters and Methods Smith writes: "[William] Chen probably climbed higher than any of Cheng Man-ching’s students, except the converted White Crane boxer Huang Sheng-hsien (who after learning t’ai chi moved to Singapore and acquired some fame there...)"

T'ai chi ch'uan lineage tree with Yang-style focus

References

External links
 Huang Tai Chi Tenom Malaysia: Huang Association in Tenom Sabah Malaysia. Several students of Huang Sheng Shyan. Includes links related to Huang Sheng Shyan.
 Sing Ong Tai Chi: Yek Sing-ong (Ye Shenen) and his students. Yek was a close student of Huang Xingxian. Includes links related to Huang Xingxian.
 HuangTaiji Shanghai, China HuangTaiji Europe: Patrick A Kelly and his students. Patrick was a close student of Huang Xingxian. Includes further links related to Huang Xingxian, especially in Europe and Shanghai.
 Taijiquan School of Central Equilibrium: Wee Kee-jin and his students. Wee Kee-jin was a close student of Huang Xingxian.
 
Huang Xingxiang Five Loosening Exercises neigong.net
 Kaiming Taijiquan: Kai Ming follow the teachings of Huang Xingxian

Chinese tai chi practitioners
1910 births
1992 deaths
Sportspeople from Fuzhou